Nort-Leulinghem is a commune in the Pas-de-Calais department in the Hauts-de-France region of France.

Geography
Nort-Leulinghem is locates about 9 miles (14 km) northwest of Saint-Omer, at the junction of the D191 and the D221 roads, half a mile from the A26 autoroute.

Population

Places of interest
 The church of St. André, dating from the sixteenth century.

See also
Communes of the Pas-de-Calais department

References

Nortleulinghem